The Santa Clara Museum occupies the space of the church of the old Royal Convent of Santa Clara, completed in 1647. It is located in the Historic Center of Bogotá (Colombia), on Carrera 8 No. 8-91. It has an extensive collection of paintings and sculptures from the 17th, 18th, 19th and 20th centuries. The building is considered one of the most representative samples of the architecture and Baroque decoration of the 17th and 18th centuries in Bogotá. This museum is an entity of the Ministry of Culture.

The Museum, housed in one of the temples that belonged to the female religious communities of the colonial period, not only has an extensive colonial collection that includes works by Gregorio Vásquez de Arce y Ceballos, Gaspar y Baltazar de Figueroa and Agustín García Zorro de Useche among others, but also has samples of mural painting scattered in the choirs, the presbytery, the main arch and the sacristy, with zoomorphic and phytomorphic motifs and some representations of saints and angels. Likewise, the museum has hosted various exhibitions of contemporary art, with which it seeks to establish relationships between artistic expression and current problems, and the decoration and culture of the colonial period.

History

Beginning

The old temple, today the museum of Santa Clara, belonged to the Franciscan female order of the Poor Clares that was founded in Santa Fe de Bogotá in the year 1629. It was built by the Spanish architect Matías de Santiago, its work began in 1629 and was completed in 1647. As for its internal ornamentation, it can be said that the temple had two decorative stages: a first (covering the entire 17th century and part of the 18th) in which mural painting was evident throughout the temple, and a second, located in the second half of the 18th century, in which the wood veneer attached to the walls and the definitive conformation of its pictorial, sculptural and altarpiece ensemble are evident.

The construction of both the church and the convent were sponsored by the Archbishop of the city, Fernando Arias de Ugarte, who took the appropriate steps to found in the city of Santa Fe the third female convent and the fourth for Poor Clares of the New Kingdom of Granada, this in order to house in its enclosure the maidens and widows from Santa Fe, whether Criollas or from the Iberian Peninsula. In the midst of the construction of the convent, on January 7, 1630, the people of Santa Fe participated in the solemn procession that, starting from the church del Carmen, reached the doors of the convent of Santa Clara with the first 24 nuns who would take their habits there. With this act the doors of the convent of Santa Clara were opened as a cloistered convent.

Life in closure
The Convent of Santa Clara, as a place of closure, received many of the women who lived in Santafé, sheltering them until their death. In the colonial period (16th to 18th centuries) women were commonly delivered by their parents as nuns. At that time it was expensive to marry a daughter, since the woman's parents were the ones who covered the expenses of the ceremonies, as well as the so-called "dowry": a sum of money and goods that were given to the future husband for the marriage. maintenance of her. For this reason, families that had two or more daughters, and few financial resources, preferred to send them to the convent, avoiding assuming the expenses that a marriage entailed.

However, this does not mean that the convent did not charge any money for the admission of a novice, what happened was that the amount requested by the convent as a "dowry" for the maintenance of the new nun was much lower than what could be paid at that time for a marriage. Thanks to this, the destiny of a high percentage of colonial women was conventual closure, which bequeathed to convents such as Santa Clara good sums of money and goods, as well as a population of nuns and novices much higher than what we could see today in a convent.

Biography of Saint Clare
The order of Saint Clare was founded in 1212 by a wealthy noblewoman born in Assisi (Italy) in 1194 named Clare. The story tells that she, along with her sister and some young friends, decided to abandon her wealth to dedicate herself to a life of prayer and poverty, accompanying a young man who preached humility and who would later be known as Saint Francis of Assisi. The Poor Clares, as they have been known ever since, adopted the rules of Franciscan life and over time multiplied throughout Europe. In principle, the Poor Clares were located in the Chapel of San Damián near Assisi, later in 1215 San Francisco himself named Clara superior of the convent where she was; in 1223 she writes the doctrines and orders of the Poor Clares based on those of Saint Francis but suitable for women. After the discovery and subsequent conquest of the American territory, the Poor Clares arrived in the New World as a female extension of the Franciscans. As for Clare, the founder, she was declared a saint in the fourteenth century and her order served in cities like Santafé to welcome, within a closure regulated by the vows of poverty and chastity, single women or widows who should not support themselves alone according to colonial logic.

Confiscation
With the Law of Disentailment of Assets of Dead Hands, issued by President Tomás Cipriano de Mosquera in 1863, the church and the convent were expropriated from the Poor Clares. The temple passed for a time at the hands of the State and was finally handed over to the Congregation of the Sacred Heart of Jesus for administration. Despite the fact that during the Regeneration the church was returned to its original owners, it was never again occupied by the Poor Clares.

Present
In the last decade, the Santa Clara Museum has positioned itself not only as a museum reference related to colonial culture, but also as an exhibition space open to contemporary art. Likewise, in recent years, the Santa Clara Museum has undergone a museographic renovation that has made its history and collections more accessible to the visiting public, providing information about the place and the different spaces that house it through interactive mechanisms. That new studies and restoration processes have also been carried out, which include the mural painting and the pulpit of the old temple, relocated to its original place in April 2014.

Architecture

Inheritance
Its architecture is in the Romanesque style, since it has semicircular arches, so the church would be of the Spanish Baroque, being characteristic of the Unadorned Baroque as it does not have many decorations on the façade. The church has only one nave, a tower at the top; From the outside you can see an architrave ceiling, although inside the ceiling forms a barrel vault without cuts, except for a semicircular arch that separates the chancel from the rest of the structure.

The floor and the walls are made of low-priced materials from the time, since at that time it was difficult to make something very elaborate; Inside you can see a second floor, on the walls, pilasters and in the back a series of niches where religious figures are found. The place has already been desecrated even though it retains these characteristics and definitions. This is very similar in style to the other colonial churches in Bogotá.

It is this old representative church of the female religious temple, with a single nave with a rectangular floor plan and a thirteen (13) meter high vaulted ceiling, with two access doors from the east, following the customary layout for female convent churches. and according to the rules issued by the Council of Trent to respect the closed architecture of the closing choirs.

Style
It is part of the tempered Baroque that distinguished the colonial monuments of the New Kingdom of Granada. It is characterized by the lack of Baroque solutions in terms of space and structure and by its manifest decorative richness that is evident here in the mural painting and in the profuse covered in carved and gilded wood of the altarpieces. In this construction, elements of the Mudéjar, Renaissance and Baroque styles, a reflection of a very colonial artistic work as well as the geographical and social conditions of Bogotá in the 17th and 18th centuries. The layout of the church is the work of Master Matías de Santiago, with massive and very austere walls made of masonry in which few windows open, and finished off in the northeast corner by a brick belfry.

Decorated

Between the severe exterior of the building and its interior floor there is an enormously striking contrast. The vaulted ceiling is studded with golden wooden flowers (in the Baroque style) that, having spaces in blue and yellow, reflect the two colors of the Immaculate Conception. Also with altarpieces on both walls, mural painting, starry latticework and a collection of oil paintings, they cover the walls without leaving a single empty space.

The interior has something common among colonial churches regarding the main colors that can be seen in the decoration, and that is that there are two mainly: red and yellow. Red in the Catholic Church symbolizes the blood of Christ, while yellow symbolizes the ostia of wheat, which represents the body of Christ.

In some parts of the interior walls of the church there are original frescoes from the 17th century that were covered in red wood with golden stars.

The pictorial legacy comes from the 17th and 18th centuries. The themes of this iconography belong to the Old and New Testaments, their motifs being repeated several times in different versions.

There are 103 paintings (many of them signed by Gaspar y Baltazar de Figueroa and Gregorio Vásquez de Arce y Ceballos), 24 carvings in stewed wood with polychrome figures from the 17th and 18th centuries.

Examples of colonial Colombian art inside the church museum

Portraits of the Dead Nuns

The museum has a sample of the series of portraits of dead abbesses that the Santa Clara building preserves. The nuns used to be portrayed when professing, covered with jewels and flowers, carrying the lighted candle, when they were elected abbesses of their community, when they went out to found a new monastery and at the moment of death.

The legend that accompanies the portraits gives an account of the life and exemplary conduct of the deceased. The crown of flowers that surrounds her head alludes to the triumph over the rigors and hardships of religious life, a victory achieved by the portrayed.

These portraits were intended to adorn the Chapter house of convents and served as an example for the community of Poor Clares. Some bear the signature of famous painters of the time but most are anonymous.

Presbytery

It is the most sacred place in the church, where the altar is located and from where the priest or presbyter celebrated mass at that time, for this reason it can be seen that the floor and the ceiling in this part of the nave are higher with respect to from the rest of the church, this denoted that the people who were located in this place, the priest and some altar boys who helped in the celebration of the mass, were closer to God. As was customary at that time, the priest had to celebrate and officiate the mass always with his back to the public, directing his gaze towards the main altarpiece that is located on the south wall of the church, in addition, the entire mass was proclaimed in Latin in accordance with what was established at the Council of Trent held in the mid-sixteenth century in Italy.

You can admire a collection of paintings alluding to the archangels in the upper part of the presbytery, it is one of the most important collections in the city thanks to its quality and technique.

Crypt
There is also a crypt ordered to be built by the greatest benefactors of the convent, Doña María Arias de Ugarte and her third husband, Don Juan de Capiayn, who wanted to be buried in the church (as was the custom at the time), since there were no cemeteries; The first cemetery in the city, the Central Cemetery, began to be built in 1830, and its construction was ordered by Simón Bolívar himself in order to prohibit the burial of corpses in churches and courtyards of health convents. What is striking about the crypt is its location, in the most sacred place in the church: the presbytery, just below the altar and the main altarpiece, was completed the same year that the church was consecrated as such in 1647, as reads the inscription in Old Castilian on the earthenware that covers the crypt.

Main altarpiece

Together with the choir and main arch, it represents the most splendid focus of the church. Built around the middle of the 17th century, it consists of three bodies and five streets, carved and gilded entirely in gold leaf, paid for entirely by Doña María Arias de Ugarte, according to historical documents it cost her the value of 4,200 pesos of a 8 shields. The niches exhibit figures carved in wood, several with costumes made of glued fabric and richly decorated with the techniques of stew and sgraffito.

Exhibitor
It is of later construction, since it dates from the 18th century, it stood out as a very Baroque element, in which the rich carving of the colonnades and the decoration of branches, bunches and little birds establishes a significant contrast with the more measured architecture of the complex.

Sacristy
This is a space annexed to the main nave of the church, and it was the place destined to store the ornaments, the sacred vessels and the officiants to dress. Following the example of the temples converted into museums and therefore devoid of worship, some objects that have been part of three centuries of church history are exhibited in this enclosure, as a documentary complement to the understanding of the whole. According to the order IX of the constitutions of the Poor Clares, she was the "Sacristina", the nun in charge of the care, surveillance and cleanliness of the objects of divine worship.

Liturgical vestments
The elaboration of these elements worked in gold, silver and silver gilt, made with the techniques of carving, embossing, hammering, openwork, chiseling, among others, in most cases decorated with inlays of precious stones, was included among the so-called minor arts.

Several of these sacred ornaments are kept on display to illustrate in a certain way the original atmosphere of the church, such as: two sun-type monstrances in gilt silver and with semi-precious stones, an incense burner to purify the church with aroma, a naveta to store incense and a stew and hyssop that was used by the father to bless with water. You can see one of the few parts where a sample of the original mural painting of the church of Santa Clara is still preserved.

Candlesticks
Two carved silver candlesticks from the 17th century destined to accompany the High Cross. The word ciril comes from the word cirio and means the tall candlestick, which the altar boys carry for masses, vespers and sung lauds as well as for solemn processions. These are shaped like pitchers with twisted handles and carved foliage with cherub heads, possibly made in the city.

high cross
Processional cross in carved silver from the 17th century. It was used in processions and funeral processions of great solemnity. It bears the image of Jesus crucified on the obverse and the Blessed Virgin on the reverse. The symbols of Christ's passion are engraved on the base: the crown of thorns, the column, the nails, the rooster, the spear and the dice. At the ends it is topped by cherubs with outstretched wings.

Central Body (nave or assembly)

It is the space between the choirs and the main arch (which is the arch that protrudes from the wall in the southern part of the nave). It can be said that this place was the public space, or where the parishioners who did not belong to the religious community of the Poor Clares could be located to celebrate mass. These parishioners had to enter the church through the northeast door, since the main door was opened exclusively to allow the exit of religious images and people who attended special processions on commemoration dates.

It is possible to admire in this space a small inset in the floor of the original bricks of the church, since the floor that is currently found is simply a representation of the original floor. It is good to point out that most of the altarpieces and paintings from the church's collection are found in the central body; each of these altarpieces is dedicated to a particular saint, accompanied by several others.

Pulpit Tribune

The pulpit was attached to the right side of the main arch, on the epistle side, and was crowned by a sounding board finished off with the image of Saint Bonaventure. It has elements from the 17th century, such as the inlay work that can be seen on one of its faces, and the figures of three evangelists are attached: Saint Luke, Saint Mark and Saint Matthew, molded in plaster and decorated with fine gilding and sgraffito work done in the 18th century. A wooden ladder decorated with tempera paint gave access to the gallery.

Chorus
The choir presents one of the material and mental spaces of greatest significance within conventual life, since daily services accompanied by songs took place there, which together with sacrifice and the practice of the Eucharist, led to the perfection pursued by these nuns, spaces of intimacy, recollection, praise and prayer.

Every three years the abbess is elected in the choir. After the position of abbess, the choir nun occupies a prominent place within the hierarchy of the convent. In the lower part of the choir or sotocoro, those nuns held in special esteem for their outstanding virtues are frequently buried. In the Santa Clara choir, the richness of the Mudéjar starry in what remains of the original lattice reveals the intimate nature of the space.

The choirs of nuns
The architecture of the choirs varies according to the splendor and wealth of each temple, the means available for each building, the imagination and skill of the builders, master builders, carvers, assemblers and painters. Spain and Portugal have magnificent examples of these choirs, and in the New World especially Querétaro. The choirs are the sacred spaces of the enclosure and are generally composed of the following elements:

Bars: they are arranged in the upper and lower choir, a symbol of the confinement of the virgins. They were generally worked in wood or in thick wrought iron, with knots and spikes, and in some choirs they wore doubles.
Cratícula: it could be one or two, it was a small window carved in wood through which communion was offered to the nuns, it was usually placed next to the grille of the lower choir. This piece must have been part of a larger group called the Monastery Grada, which had the objective of separating the enclosure space from the rest of the church nave.
Tribune: it could be one or several and its purpose was to house the instruments for music as in the case of Santa Clara, or to serve for the assistance to the office of the venerable or sick religious.
Fan: large-format element in the form of a semicircle, which finishes off and crowns the high choir in which arabesques, foliage scrolls and carved latticework are displayed. It often had a large Christ in the center that seemed to shelter the whole.

In Mexico the choirs of nuns were profusely decorated with carvings and paintings. Inside the high choir, the stalls were placed for the use of the nuns in the rest and singing of the office. In the churches of nuns the usual thing was that the choirs were placed at the foot of the church, but there were also in the presbytery. They always communicated with the convent.

See also
List of buildings in Bogotá

References

External links

Roman Catholic churches in Bogotá
Roman Catholic churches completed in 1647
National Monuments of Colombia
Spanish Colonial architecture in Colombia
Poor Clare monasteries
Museums in Bogotá